Abu'l-Husayn Muhammad ibn Ali, better known by his nickname Akhu Muhsin, was a 10th-century anti-Isma'ili writer.

Himself of Alid descent, Akhu Muhsin lived in Damascus, and was one of the first writers interested in Alid genealogy. Based to a large degree on the previous anti-Isma'ili tract of Ibn Rizam, which now survives only in fragmentary form, he composed his own treatise against the Fatimid Caliphate and their Isma'ili adherents . It too does not survive but in fragments, incorporated in the works of the later historians al-Nuwayri, Ibn al-Dawadari, and al-Maqrizi. 

From the fragments, it appears that Akhu Muhsin's work contained separate parts dealing with history and doctrine. However, already al-Maqrizi condemned both Akhu Muhsin and Ibn Rizam as unreliable. Indeed, the work introduced extensive quotations from an anonymous tract, the Kitāb al-siyāsa ("Book of Methodology" or "Book of the Highest Initiation"), which purported to be an Isma'ili work describing methods of winning new converts and initiating them into the secrets of the Isma'ili doctrine. Its fabricated content was tailored to justify the rejection of the Isma'ilis as antinomian atheists and libertines, and ensured it a long existence as the main source for "several generations of polemicists and heresiographers" targeting the Isma'ilis. Ibn Rizam and Akhu Mahsin's account thus "provided the basis for most subsequent Sunni writing", notably the public denunciation of the Fatimids in the Baghdad Manifesto of 1011, sponsored by the Abbasid caliph al-Qadir. Their work thus  became the accepted version outside the Isma'ili community, not only on Isma'ili doctrine, but also on the origins of the Isma'ili movement, including in Western scholarly circles, until the start of a more critical evaluation of the historical sources in the 20th century.

References

Sources
 
 

980s deaths
10th-century Arabs
Year of birth unknown
Year of death uncertain
Anti-Ismailism
Alids
History of Ismailism
Writers from Damascus